Emilia reddyi is a herbaceous plant species belonging to the family of Asteraceae found from Eastern Ghats, India.

Emilia reddyi is named in honor of NRSC scientist Dr. C. Sudhakar Reddy for his significant contribution to the field of plant taxonomy and biodiversity conservation in the country.

Conservation status
Critically Endangered (CR B1 a+ B2 a).

References

Senecioneae
Flora of India (region)